The New Ruvu Bridge is a bridge in Tanzania that crosses the Ruvu River. It was inaugurated by the Tanzanian Vice President Ali Mohamed Shein in 2009 It lies on the A7 highway connecting the city of Dar es Salaam to the other regions.

References

Bridges in Tanzania